Baillieu is a surname. Notable people with the surname include:

 Chris Baillieu (born 1949), rower
 Clive Baillieu, 1st Baron Baillieu (1889–1967), businessman and public servant
James Baillieu (born 1968), lawyer
 Kate Baillieu (born 1946), activist
 Marshall Baillieu (born 1937), politician
 Merlyn Baillieu (1900–1982), see Merlyn Myer, philanthropist and co-founder of Myer dynasty
 Ted Baillieu (born 1953), politician, former Premier of Victoria
 William Baillieu (1859–1936), financier and politician

See also
 Baillieu Library, University of Melbourne
 Baillieu Peak
 Baron Baillieu
 Bailliu

French-language surnames